Man vs. Bee is a 2022 British comedy streaming television series created and written by Rowan Atkinson and William Davies. The show consists of nine episodes, each of them directed by David Kerr. Atkinson stars as a down-on-his-luck man who finds himself entrenched in a battle with a bee while house sitting a rich couple's modern mansion. Jing Lusi, Claudie Blakley, Tom Basden, Julian Rhind-Tutt, Greg McHugh and India Fowler also feature. Man vs. Bee premiered on Netflix on 24 June 2022 and received generally positive reviews from critics.

Premise 
A house sitter named Trevor finds himself entrenched in an ongoing battle with a bumblebee while lodging amidst an elegant mansion.

Cast 
 Rowan Atkinson as Trevor Bingley, a house sitter who finds himself in a battle with a bee as he causes irreparable damage.
 Jing Lusi as Nina Kolstad-Bergenbatten, the owner of the luxurious mansion that Trevor is house-sitting. She also owns a pet dog named Cupcake.
 Julian Rhind-Tutt as Christian Kolstad-Bergenbatten, Nina's husband.
 Greg McHugh as The Gardener.
 India Fowler as Maddy, Trevor's daughter.
 Claudie Blakley as Jess, Trevor's ex-wife.
 Tom Basden as the Police Officer.

Additionally, Gediminas Adomaitis appears as Marek, Christian Alifoe as Karl, and Daniel Fearn as Lewis, the three burglars. Chizzy Akudolu appears as the judge, and Aysha Kala as the detective.

Episodes

Production

Development 
Man vs. Bee was created by Atkinson and William Davies. The series was written by Davies, and directed by David Kerr. Davies had "been unsuccessfully pitching bee battles to Atkinson for years". Atkinson described the process as creating a story "roughly the length of a movie", then editing to 10 episodes. The series was originally designed for a different network, but when they rejected the series, it was offered to Netflix. Atkinson said the series was inspired by a segment of Mr. Bean from 1992. The editing process included creating cliffhangers for the end of episodes, that would not be needed for a movie. Atkinson described his character as "different" to Mr. Bean, "much nicer and much sweeter and more normal person" with a "weak spot" of "obsessiveness", compared to Mr. Bean's "self-centred, narcissistic anarchist". The first script meeting occurred just over three years before, and filmed a year before, release. While promoting the series, Kerr left the possibility of a second season open.

Filming 
The series was filmed over 12 weeks, the interior scenes at Bovingdon Studios, Hertfordshire, and exterior scenes throughout Hertfordshire and Buckinghamshire. They could not film in a real house due to Covid concerns by homeowners. Branded products were used to illustrate "the couple's luxury lifestyle", though were not paid for by brand owners. The show borrowed "the oldest surviving Jaguar E-type" from its owner, but created a replica for Atkinson's character to destroy. The Bee was either a physical model, or computer-generated by Framestore, depending on whether the Bee was static.

Music 
The series was composed by Lorne Balfe, and the 20-track soundtrack was released alongside the series on 24 June 2022.

Release 
The series was announced 13 December 2020. The cast and release date were announced on 14 April 2022. The trailer for the series was released 26 May 2022. Nine episodes were released on Netflix 24 June 2022. Promotion for the series included a billboard in Manchester, and a Beano comic strip by Nigel Parkinson. Three sculptures of Atkinson were created and unveiled at St Paul's Cathedral to promote the series and raise awareness for the issues faced by "native species of British bees and pollinators".

Reception

Audience viewership 
The series was viewed for 18.2 million hours across its opening weekend, ranking tenth globally on Netflix for the week ending 26 June 2022. By 3 July 2022, the series had been viewed for 25.4 million hours and risen to seventh on Netflix globally for the preceding week.

Critical response 
 

Atkinson's performance has been praised by critics. Stuart Jeffries of The Guardian argued Atkinson was "intentionally funny in all nine episodes". James Hibbs of Radio Times argued he "doesn't stray from his trademark, cringe-inducing slapstick hijinks" and he "does it better than anyone". Anita Singh of The Telegraph said he has "lost none of his skill". Joel Keller of Decider argued "this series shows off all the skills that have made his career so successful" and "the times when Atkinson gets very physical" is a highlight. Ben Dowell of The Times described Atkinson's performance as "reassuringly familiar" and "commandingly skilful as you would expect", but less enjoyable to watch screw things up than Mr. Bean can be. Steve Bennett of Chortle said "Atkinson remains a master of this genre".

However, Imogen West-Knights of New Statesman argued Atkinson in Man vs. Bee does not reach "the queasy delights of Bean". Hibbs criticised the series for being too long and pacing lulling in the middle, West-Knights similarly criticised the release format. Vicky Jessop of Evening Standard argued the plot wears thin by the end of the first episode, and the others are too long. Jeffries, and West-Knights, criticised the lack of characterisation for the Bee. Jeffries, Sean O'Grady of The Independent, and Camilla Long of The Times, criticised the product placement.

References

External links 
 
 
 

2020s British comedy television series
2022 British television series debuts
English-language Netflix original programming
Fictional bees
Bees in popular culture
Television series about insects
Television series created by Rowan Atkinson
Works set in country houses